The Ivy Lane Club was a literary and social club founded by Samuel Johnson in the 1740s. The club met in the King's Head, a beefsteak house in Ivy Lane, Paternoster Row, near St Paul's Cathedral, London.

The members included Edmond Barker, doctor; Richard Bathurst, physician and surgeon; Samuel Dyer, gentleman; John Hawkesworth, author; Sir John Hawkins, author; William McGhie, doctor; John Payne, bookseller (i.e. publisher); John Ryland, merchant;  Dr Samuel Salter, Archdeacon of Norwich.

See also
 The Club
 Steak
 FIFA 13 (Stadium)

References
 Christopher Hibbert, The personal history of Samuel Johnson (1971)

1740s establishments in England
Literary societies
1740s in London
History of the City of London